Izydor Jabłoński (born February 7, 1865 in Kraków, died November 13, 1905 therein) was a Polish painter, professor at the Jan Matejko Academy of Fine Arts in Kraków, friend and biographer of Jan Matejko.

Biography

In the years of 1848 to 1856, he studied at the Jan Matejko Academy of Fine Arts in Kraków, where he was taught by Wojciech Stattler, Władysław Łuszczkiewicz, and sculpture by Henryk Kossowski. He completed his further studies in Munich and Rome. In the years of 1860 to 1861, he travelled around the Balkans and the Near East; and in 1873 around Russia. Between the years of 1877 to 1899, he was a professor at the Jan Matejko Academy of Fine Arts in Kraków.

His paintings are themed around religion, and he made many polychromes for churches in Lesser Poland. During his time as professor, he taught many artists which lived in Kraków at the time, inter alia: Józef Mehoffer, Edward Okuń, Wojciech Weiss, Ludwik Stasiak, Stanisław Wyspiański, and Zefiryn Ćwikliński. In 1879, he was the director of the Society of Friends of Fine Arts (Towarzystwo Przyjaciół Sztuk Pięknych) in Kraków.

He was buried in the Rakowicki Cemetery, in the tomb of the Szubertów Family, in the Fifth Quarter.

In the Holy Cross Church (Kościół Świętego Krzyża) in Kraków, there is an epitaph for the Jabłonski Family, for Izydor Jabłoński and his brother Leon Jabłoński - a sculptor.

References

External links

1835 births
1905 deaths
19th-century Polish painters
19th-century Polish male artists
20th-century Polish painters
20th-century Polish male artists
Polish male painters